Dante Tomaselli (born October 29, 1969, in Paterson, New Jersey) is an Italian-American horror screenwriter, director, and score composer. In 2013 Fearnet named Tomaselli one of their "Favorite Underrated Horror Directors", as they found his work "unique and eccentric". Tomaselli is currently working on a remake of the 1976 film Alice, Sweet Alice, which was directed by his cousin Alfred Sole.

Biography
Tomaselli was born on October 29, 1969 in Paterson, New Jersey. He expressed interest in becoming a horror filmmaker while he was still a child due to his enjoyment of films such as The Exorcist and Don't Look Now, which he would watch with his mother at local theaters. He studied filmmaking at Brooklyn's Pratt Institute and later transferred to the New York School of Visual Arts, where he received a B.F.A. degree in Advertising. In 1999 he released his first film, Desecration, which he based on an earlier-made 23-minute short. On January 14, 2014, Tomaselli released his first audio CD of electronic horror music, Scream in the Dark, through Elite Entertainment and MVD Audio.

Tomaselli is gay and was involved with a project called Gay of the Dead.

Themes and influences
Tomaselli heavily utilizes themes of Catholicism and Christianity in his work, which is inspired partly by his Catholic upbringing as a child though he is critical of the concept of religion as a whole. Other factors that influenced his work include Tomaselli's relation to Sole and surrealism, as well as severe nightmares he had as a child, which he has tried to work into his films. Some critics mistakenly attribute directors such as Dario Argento and Lucio Fulci as influences due to some similarities between their work, but Tomaselli stated in an interview with author Matthew Edwards that he did not view those directors' work until his early twenties.

Reception
Critical reception to Tomaselli's films is usually very polarized, with some criticizing the films as lacking a linear plot line. Other critics have praised the films for this feature and remarked on the variety of filmgoers' reactions by saying that the movies would not appeal to all viewers and especially not to those that favor more mainstream fare or do not prefer surreal films.

Discography
Scream in the Dark (2014) 
The Doll (2014)
Nightmare (2015)
Witches (2017)

Filmography

References

External links
 

American male screenwriters
American horror writers
Film producers from New Jersey
American male writers
Pratt Institute alumni
Writers from Paterson, New Jersey
1969 births
Living people
LGBT film directors
American gay writers
American LGBT musicians
LGBT producers
American LGBT screenwriters
LGBT people from New Jersey
Critics of religions
Film directors from New Jersey
Screenwriters from New Jersey
21st-century American LGBT people